Ocean FM (95.5 FM) is a defunct radio station in the Cayman Islands in the British West Indies. The station was owned by Cerentis Broadcasting Systems. It aired a classic hits music format.

The station's last license was issued on 11 December, 2003. Ocean FM went off the air in late 2006 and was put up for sale but technical and financial issues made such a sale untenable and the government revoked the license on 16 August 2007.

Honors and awards
In 2004, Ocean FM was presented with the International Quality Summit Award in recognition of the radio station's commitment to quality, leadership, technology and innovation. The station accepted the award on June 21, 2004 at the 18th International Convention Quality Summit in New York City.

References

Radio stations in the Cayman Islands
Radio stations disestablished in 2007
Defunct radio stations in the United Kingdom